Contemporary Art Museum of Raleigh (CAM Raleigh) is a multimedia contemporary art gallery in Raleigh, North Carolina. CAM Raleigh has no permanent collection but offers exhibitions of works by artists with regional, national, and international recognition. The museum characterizes itself by the statements "We seek the most contemporary art and design. We work to curate it in a way that's always fresh. We create an ever-changing experience that is always in progress."

CAM is a collaboration of the College of Design at North Carolina State University and a private 501(c)(3) organization founded in 1983 as the City Museum of Contemporary Art. Since 2011, CAM Raleigh has been housed in a 1910 warehouse in downtown Raleigh providing 20,000 square feet of space. The facility was re-purposed by Brooks + Scarpa.

Exhibitions have included works by Angel Otero, Marilyn Minter, Heather Gordon, Leonardo Drew, Sarah Cain, Dorian Lynde and Jonathan Horowitz.

References

External links
Official site
news coverage of opening

Arts centers in North Carolina
Museums in Raleigh, North Carolina
Art museums and galleries in North Carolina
Modern art museums in the United States
Contemporary art galleries in the United States
Art museums established in 2011
2011 establishments in North Carolina